The Native Plant Trust, founded in 1900 as the Society for the Protection of Native Plants, and long known as the New England Wild Flower Society, is the nation's first plant conservation organization. The society is dedicated to the preservation of native plants and operates Garden in the Woods (a native plant botanical garden) at its headquarters in Framingham, Massachusetts. It also offers courses on topics of conservation and horticulture of native plants, manages a "conservation corps" of volunteers throughout New England, operates several native plant sanctuaries, and offers nursery-propagated native plants for sale at its two nurseries.

Initiatives
Seed banking is a strategy used by the Native Plant Trust to preserve the genetic diversity of endangered plant species for potential future re-introductions. In proceeding with reintroductions of endangered species, guidelines are to be followed which evaluates the benefits and risks when considering re-introductions.

The Native Plant Trust promotes ecological gardening to help create a healthier ecosystem in any ecoregion. For New England, they have assembled a list of some of the native species to plant as well as invasive species to avoid in their region for gardeners to keep in mind when gardening or buying seeds for their garden. The Native Plant Trust hosts events throughout the year including family activities, tours, and social gatherings.

References

External links
Official website

Native plant societies based in the United States
Environmental organizations based in Massachusetts